Banainy Dhounkla is a village in the Bharatpur district of Rajasthan.
near the nagar tehsil of Rajasthan.

References 

 https://www.google.co.in/maps/place/Banainy+Dhounkla,+Rajasthan+321024/@27.4807998,77.1529644,17z/data=!3m1!4b1!4m5!3m4!1s0x3972fd1b77129e51:0xc88e8fdb86592433!8m2!3d27.4805922!4d77.1549874

Villages in Bharatpur district